Imperial Theater or Imperial Theatre may refer to:

In Europe
 Imperial Theater, Copenhagen, Denmark
 Imperial Theatre, at the former Royal Aquarium, London
 Imperial Theatres of Russian Empire, existed in Saint Petersburg and Moscow till 1917.

In North America
 Imperial Theatre (Augusta, Georgia)
 Imperial Theater (San Francisco)
 Imperial Theatre, New York City
 Imperial Theatre, Saint John, New Brunswick, Canada
 Imperial Theatre, Toronto, former cinema now the Ed Mirvish Theatre

See also
 Imperial Theatre (Japan)

Lists of theatres